Brenda Burnside (born March 20, 1963 in Albuquerque, New Mexico) is an American former women's boxing "journeywoman". Despite being given such title by boxing fans and critics (a journeyman or woman in boxing is someone who takes fights, usually on short period, and loses to other fighters), she was well known in the boxing world for the quality of opposition she faced; and she contended for a world title once. She fought in the Super Flyweight division.

Career 
Burnside began her professional boxing career on August 8, 1997, at the relatively old age (for a boxer) of 32, losing a four-round decision to Gloria Ramirez, in Houston, Texas. Burnside lost her first four fights, but her opposition included Valerie Troike (twice) and future world champion Sandra Yard.

Her first win came on March 12, 1998, when she outpointed Jayla Ortiz over four rounds in Santa Fe. On her next fight, she defeated Dolores Lira.

Burnside began to show a promising future when she dealt Sue Chase a fifth round knockout defeat on June 3 of that year, in the  Worley, Idaho. Sixteen days later, she and Gloria Ramirez were rematched, in Coachella, California. Their second bout resulted in a four-round draw.

Burnside went on to win two more fights in a row, when she and Jayla Ortiz were rematched, on October 17, at Las Vegas, Nevada. The second time , Burnside and Ortiz fought to a six-round draw.

On January 23, 1999, Burnside beat former world champion Imelda Arias by a second-round knockout. On March 13, she made her Madison Square Garden debut, dropping an eight-round split decision to Bridgett Riley. On June 16, she lost to future world champion Margaret Sidoroff for the WIBF's intercontinental Super Flyweight title, by a ten-round unanimous decision, in New Orleans, Louisiana. On August 14, she lost to Kathy Williams, but she got a break on her next fight, beating Rosie Johnson by a four-round unanimous decision on November 18. She finished 1999 by dropping another four-round decision, to Kelsey Jeffries, on December 14.

By 2000, Burnside was already contemplating retirement from boxing. Nevertheless, an opportunity to face the well known, two time world champion Para Draine came by, and Burnside accepted it. On February 17, at Worley, she lost to Draine by an eight-round split decision.

Burnside was considering retirement again after this fight, but there still would be one more fight in her career.

She received a world title shot after losing two fights in a row, which is a very unusual circumstance in boxing. With the opportunity of becoming a world champion offered to her, she accepted to fight Daisy Lang in what also was her first and last fight abroad. Fighting for the WIBF's world Super Flyweight championship, Burnside lost a ten-round unanimous decision in Germany and later retired from boxing.

Her boxing record was 7 wins, 11 losses and 2 draws, with 4 knockout wins.

Professional boxing record

See also
 List of female boxers

References

External links
 Brenda Burnside at Awakening Fighters
boxer Box Rec Profile

1963 births
Living people
American women boxers
Boxers from Albuquerque, New Mexico
Flyweight boxers
21st-century American women